The Millennium Tower is a 50-storey, 171 meter skyscraper, the second tallest building and fourth tallest structure in Austria at . The tower is located at Handelskai 94–96 in the Brigittenau 20th district in Vienna, Austria. An antenna mounted on top of the tower brings the total height to  but does not count towards the building's architectural height.

Millennium Tower was designed by the architects  Gustav Peichl, Boris Podrecca and Rudolf Weber. The tower has 51 floors, serves both commercial and residential purposes, and is the focal point of a complex known as "Millennium City". It was completed in 1999 for the coming of the third millennium. The remaining area is to 2 levels are generally available and is used for a shopping center (Millennium City), restaurants and a multiplex cinema (UCI). The Millennium Tower was built in an extremely short construction time: Thanks to efficient organization of all work steps and modern building techniques have created an average of 2 ½ floors a week and the building completed in 1999.

Architecture 
The shape of the tower is formed by two clasped each other fully glazed cylinder which is supported by a steel composite structure. The Millennium Tower was designed by the architects Gustav Peichl, Boris Podrecca and Rudolf F. Weber.

The operating contractor was the consortium Habau - Voestalpine - MCE.

Tenants 
In the Millennium Tower, around 136 companies have rented office space, including major international companies such as Xerox, most look from there after their Eastern European activities, like many other international companies in Vienna they have advantages from the good Austrian relations to eastern European Countries. Other tenants include: inter alia Cirquent, Trivadis, CSC, Carlson Wagonlit, Inode (UTA), Agip and Cisco.

Owner 
Owner George Stumpf sold the Millennium Tower in Vienna on 25 July 2003 along with the associated Millennium City to the Hamburg-based issuing house MPC (Münchmeyer Capital). The purchase price was 360 million euros, which is close to 15-times the annual income of 24.5 million euro (2002) corresponds to the Millennium City, which is next to the offices in the Tower and form a shopping center, residential buildings and the largest cinema complex in Austria. Taking into account the building costs of 145 million Euros, there is a profit of 215 million euros.

MCN 
As part of the building was also built up its own internal telecommunications infrastructure, in which case the MCN Millennium Communication Network AG acted as a telephone and Internet service provider. With shared use of Telekom Austria infrastructure, this could also serve as provider countrywide. As MCN ran into financial difficulties in 2000, the existing network was acquired by Inode (UTA) Austria.

External links 

 Official Millennium-City-Homepage (German)
 Millennium Tower at Emporis.com, general database of skyscrapers
 Millennium Tower at SkyscraperPage.com

Buildings and structures completed in 1999
Skyscrapers in Vienna
Residential buildings in Vienna
Tourist attractions in Vienna
Buildings and structures celebrating the third millennium
Buildings and structures in Brigittenau
Residential skyscrapers
Retail buildings in Austria
1999 establishments in Austria
20th-century architecture in Austria